Keegan Edwin Smith (born June 9, 1993) is an American soccer player.

Career

College
Smith spent one year at Cal Poly University in 2011, before transferring to the University of San Diego in 2012. SMith sat out the 2012 college season due to injury, but from 2013 onwards he made a total of 52 appearances for the Toreros and tallied 13 goals and 6 assists.

Smith appeared for Premier Development League side Orange County Blue Star in 2012 and National Premier Soccer League side Temecula FC in 2015.

Professional
On January 14, 2016, Smith was selected in the second round (39th overall) of the 2016 MLS SuperDraft by Montreal Impact. However, he wasn't signed by Montreal, instead joining United Soccer League side Orlando City B on March 11, 2016.

References

External links
Cal Poly bio
San Diego bio

1993 births
Living people
American soccer players
Association football forwards
Cal Poly Mustangs men's soccer players
CF Montréal draft picks
National Premier Soccer League players
Orange County Blue Star players
Orlando City B players
San Diego Toreros men's soccer players
Soccer players from California
Sportspeople from Oceanside, California
Sportspeople from Temecula, California
Temecula FC players
USL Championship players
USL League Two players